Annie Ousset-Krief, Ph.D. and associate professor at the Sorbonne Nouvelle - Paris 3 University, is a French historian and American Civilization specialist.

Biography 
Annie Ousset-Krief received her Ph.D. in American Civilization with thesis, titled "Le «Jewish Messenger» et l'immigration juive d'Europe Orientale aux États-Unis (1870–1902) - Solidarités et antagonismes intercommunautaires" in 2002, under the direction of Serge Ricard.
Annie Ousset-Krief is an associate professor of American Civilization at the Sorbonne Nouvelle - Paris 3 University and currently focuses her work on the North-American Jewish community, on the American East-Coast and French Canada.

Books 
 Les Juifs d'Europe Orientale aux États-Unis 1880-1905; Yidn ale brider : immigration et solidarité, L'Harmattan, Paris, 2009
 Les Juifs américains et Israël; De l'AIPAC à JStreet, L'Harmattan, Paris, 2012

Articles 
 "Le B'nai Brith de Montréal s'oppose à la Charte de la laïcité du Parti Québécois",Actualité Juive N°1221, August 2012
 "Soukkot à Montréal", Actualité Juive N°1226, October 2012
 "Des Rabbins pour Obama", Actualité Juive N°1227, October 2012
 "L'American Jewish Committee commémore "Freedom Sunday"", Actualité Juive N°1236, December 2012
 "Anatomie du judaïsme américain", Information Juive N°324, July/August 2012
 "L'antisionisme sur les campus américains", Information Juive N°331, March 2013
 "Heureux comme Dieu au Québec...?", Information Juive N°332, April 2013
 "New York aux couleurs d'Israël", Actualité Juive, May 2013
 "Unir les organisations juives", Information Juive N°334, July–August 2013
 "« FDR et les Juifs » : un nouveau livre relance le débat sur l’action du président Roosevelt pendant la Shoah", Information Juive, September 2013
 "Les Juifs de Montréal", Lev Ha'ir magazine N°25, September–October 2013
 "JStreet et Israël", Lev Ha'ir magazine N°26, November 2013
 "Une charte de la laïcité contestée", Lev Ha'ir magazine N°26, November 2013
 "Les Juifs marocains de Montréal", Information Juive, November 2013
 "Il faut libérer Jonathan Pollard", Information Juive, January 2014
 "Bienvenue en Israël, cher ami ! Stephen Harper en Israël", Lev Ha'ir magazine, February 2014

Interviews 
 Émission Maison d'étude, France Culture, August 2012
 Élections américaines, Actualité Juive N°1227, October 2012

Conferences and seminars 
 Grands débats philosophiques, Cégep de Saint-Hyacinthe, 2006
 « Le yiddishland newyorkais », Colloque International – LERMA Géographies Identitaires : lieu, mémoire, ancrages, Université Aix-Marseille, December 2006
 Knowing the Other: A Discussion on Religious Pluralism in Canadian Society, McGill University, January 2013
 « The Hassidim of Brooklyn: Religion and Interculturality », Congrès 2013 - Angers "Religion et spiritualité", Association française d’Études Américaines, May 2013
 « Les Juifs américains et Israël : vers un affaiblissement des liens ? », Juifs en Amérique du Nord : Histoires et Perspectives, Université Sorbonne Nouvelle-Paris 3, May 2013
 « Outremont: une enclave religieuse dans la cité montréalaise », Le judaïsme nord américain, Culture et religion dans les pays anglophones, February 2014
 « De Po-Lin à Outremont: les Hassidim, passeurs d'identité », Kanade, di Goldene Medine? Perspectives on Canadian-Jewish Literature and Culture conference, University of Lodz, April 2014

References

External links 
 Annie Ousset-Krief’s profile on the Sorbonne’s website
 Annie Ousset-Krief’s profile on the Harmattan Editions"
 Information Juive newspaper
 Actualité Juive newspaper

21st-century French historians
Year of birth missing (living people)
Place of birth missing (living people)
Living people
Academic staff of Sorbonne Nouvelle University Paris 3